Vendetta: Lucky's Revenge is a 1996 novel by Jackie Collins and the fourth in her Santangelo novels series.

In the movie Eurotrip, the character Scotty is reading this book on the train from Paris.

1996 British novels
Santangelo novels
Macmillan Publishers books